The bust of Robert S. Kerr by Keating Donohoe is installed in Oklahoma City's Robert S. Kerr Park, between Robert S. Kerr Avenue and Couch Drive, in the U.S. state of Oklahoma.

Description and history

There have been two busts of Kerr. The original was commissioned by Kerr-McGee Corporation, cast in 1961, and dedicated on May 9, 1975. The sculpture was stolen on April 5, 1978, and replaced with a second cast from the same mold .

The artwork was surveyed by the Smithsonian Institution's "Save Outdoor Sculpture!" program in 1996.

References

1961 sculptures
1978 sculptures
Bronze sculptures in Oklahoma
Busts in the United States
Monuments and memorials in Oklahoma
Outdoor sculptures in Oklahoma City
Sculptures of men in Oklahoma